Abram Wallace Rosenthal (12 October 1921 – February 1986), also known as Abraham Rosenthal, was an English professional footballer who played as a striker. Rosenthal was Jewish.

Career
Born in Liverpool, Rosenthal was an amateur at Prescot Cables, and hometown club Liverpool, before turning professional in 1939 with Tranmere Rovers. Rosenthal spent three spells with Tranmere, and also spent three spells at Bradford City. Rosenthal made a total of 225 appearances in the Football League, scoring 78 goals. He also played for Oldham Athletic.

He died in February 1986, aged 64, having collapsed at his home in Woolton, Liverpool, after chasing two intruders from his house.

References

1921 births
1986 deaths
English Jews
English footballers
Jewish footballers
Association football forwards
Prescot Cables F.C. players
Liverpool F.C. players
Bradford City A.F.C. players
Tranmere Rovers F.C. players
Oldham Athletic A.F.C. players
English Football League players
Footballers from Liverpool